Marian Jeżak (26 September 1928 – 14 May 2013) was a Polish ice hockey player. He played for KTH Krynica, Unia Krynica, and Legia Warsaw during his career. He also played for the Polish national team at the 1952 Winter Olympics, and the 1955 World Championships. During his playing career Jeżak won the Polish league championship eight times: in 1950 with Krynica, and seven further times with Legia. After his playing career he turned to coaching, and led the Polish team for a few years.

References

External links
 

1928 births
2013 deaths
Ice hockey players at the 1952 Winter Olympics
KTH Krynica players
Legia Warsaw (ice hockey) players
Olympic ice hockey players of Poland
People from Krynica-Zdrój
Polish ice hockey coaches
Polish ice hockey forwards